The Serbia national under-20 football team (Serbian Latin: Omladinska reprezentacija Srbije) is the national under-20 football team of Serbia. Like the senior national team, it is controlled by the Football Association of Serbia. On 2015 FIFA U-20 World Cup in New Zealand Serbia U20 won the final against Brazil 2–1, becoming the first team representing the country to win a FIFA competition title since their independence from Yugoslavia and the dissolution of Serbia and Montenegro. Yugoslavia U20 previously won the 1987 FIFA World Youth Championship.

History

Yugoslavia (1977–1992)

Yugoslavia Under-20 had appeared at two World Youth Championships throughout their existence. Their first appearance came at the 1979 tournament, where they were knocked out in the group stage after two defeats (0–2 against Poland and 0–1 against Argentina) and one win (5–0 against Indonesia). Their second appearance in the 1987 tournament was much more successful, as they won the competition, remarkably defeating each of the three other semi-finalists and eliminating the defending champions Brazil during the course of the tournament, with Robert Prosinečki, Croatian, winning the Golden Ball award for Best Player of the tournament.

Serbia and Montenegro (1992–2006)
FR Yugoslavia/Serbia and Montenegro under-20 team did not qualify for World Youth Championships.

Serbia (since 2006)
Serbia first appearance as independent country came at the 2015 tournament in New Zealand, where they won the competition.

Competitive Record
 Champions   Runners-Up   Third Place   Fourth Place

FIFA U-20 World Cup Record
The FIFA U-20 World Cup, until 2005 known as the FIFA World Youth Championship, is the world championship of football for players under the age of 20 and is organized by FIFA.

Honours

Titles
 FIFA U-20 World Cup:
  1987
  2015

Individual awards
 FIFA World Youth Championship Golden Ball
 Robert Prosinečki – 1987
 FIFA World Youth Championship Silver Ball
 Zvonimir Boban – 1987
 FIFA U-20 World Cup Bronze Ball
 Sergej Milinković-Savić – 2015
 FIFA U-20 World Cup Golden Glove
 Predrag Rajković – 2015
 FIFA World Youth Championship Silver Shoe
 Davor Šuker – 1987

Results

2014

2015

2016

2021

2015 coaching staff

Squad
The following players were called up for the friendly match against Italy on 6 September 2021.

Caps and goals updated as of 6 September 2021 after the game against Italy.

Previous squads 
 1979 FIFA World Youth Championship squads – Yugoslavia
 1987 FIFA World Youth Championship squads – Yugoslavia
 2015 FIFA World Youth Championship squads – Serbia

Head coaches

Player statistics
Statistics include players who have played for the Serbia since 2006.

See also
 Serbia national football team
 Serbia national under-21 football team
 Serbia national under-19 football team
 Serbia national under-17 football team
 Yugoslavia national under-20 football team

References

External links
 Football Association of Serbia 

European national under-20 association football teams
U